Henri Paul Émile Victor Cassiers (11 August 1858 – 1944), also known as Henry and Hendrick Cassiers, was a Belgian Art Nouveau artist and illustrator.

Early life
Born in Antwerp in 1858, Cassiers was the son of Paul Cassiers and Victoire Pelgrims. For six years he studied architecture in Brussels with Paul Saintenoy and took courses at the Royal Academy of Fine Arts and other schools. Largely self-taught as a painter in watercolours, he became a skilful draughtsman. In 1881, he had his first exhibition of paintings, which went well, and gave up on architecture.

At about this time, Cassiers went to live in the fishing town of Knokke, where there was a large artist colony which included Alfred Verwee, Louis Artan, Flori van Acker, Franz Courtens, and later Alfred Bastien and Firmin Baes.

Career
After 1881, Cassiers continued to exhibit and to travel. He had successful exhibitions in Brittany, England, Switzerland, Germany, Italy, and other countries. He established his focus on commercial illustration, and his work was featured in well-known newspapers, magazines, hotels, restaurants, and resorts. He designed many posters, notably for the Red Star Line, a shipping company of Antwerp, his main client. For some twenty-five years he designed its posters, postcards, and menus.

Some of his most notable work was for Le Patriot Illustré, and his posters include several for the seaside town of De Haan. He also designed postcards. 

Cassiers has been called the most outstanding Flemish poster artist of the period.

Notes

Further reading
Henri Cassiers 1858–1944 (Antwerp: Uitgeverij Pandora, 1994)

External links

1858 births
1944 deaths
Belgian artists
People from Antwerp